USS Francis Scott Key (SSBN-657), a  ballistic missile submarine, was the only submarine of the United States Navy to be named for Francis Scott Key (1779–1843), an American lawyer, author, and amateur poet who wrote the poem "The Defense of Fort McHenry", which became the words to the United States' national anthem, "The Star-Spangled Banner". During World War II there was a liberty ship named SS Francis Scott Key.

Construction and commissioning
The contract to build Francis Scott Key was awarded to the Electric Boat Division of General Dynamics Corporation in Groton, Connecticut on 29 July 1963 and her keel was laid down there on 5 December 1964. She was launched on 23 April 1965, sponsored by Mrs. Marjory Key Thorne and Mrs. William T. Jarvis, both direct descendants of Key, and commissioned on 3 December 1966, with Captain Frank W. Graham in command of the Blue Crew and Lieutenant Commander Joseph B. Logan in command of the Gold Crew.

Service history
The Francis Scott Key was part of Submarine Squadron (SUBRON) 16 based in Rota, Spain.  The squadron and submarines moved to Kings Bay, Georgia in 1979.

The Key conducted the first submerged launch of a Trident missile in 1979. She also became the first submarine to go on deterrent patrol with Trident I missiles.

The Gold crew performed the submarine's last SSBN deterrent patrol, Patrol #72, in 1992.  The Key combined crews and changed homeport from Charleston, SC to Pearl Harbor, HI in late 1992.

Decommissioning and disposal
Francis Scott Key was decommissioned on 2 September 1993 with Commander Carl D. Olson in command, and stricken from the Naval Vessel Register the same day. Her scrapping via the U.S. Navy's Nuclear-Powered Ship and Submarine Recycling Program at Bremerton, Washington, was completed on 1 September 1995.

References

External links

 

Ships built in Groton, Connecticut
Benjamin Franklin-class submarines
Cold War submarines of the United States
Nuclear submarines of the United States Navy
1965 ships